Top Management is a 2018 South Korean series that premiered on October 31, 2018 on YouTube Premium. It is based on an original novel by Jang Woo-san about idols who dream about going on stage, which was published in 2015 by Munpia. The series stars Seo Eun-soo, Ahn Hyo-seop and Cha Eun-woo.

Synopsis
The story centers on Eun-sung, a former girl idol trainee with the power to foresee the future, who becomes the manager of the aspiring, but struggling, boy idol group "S.O.U.L."

Cast

Main
 Seo Eun-soo as Yoo Eun-sung
 Ahn Hyo-seop as Hyun Soo-yong
 Cha Eun-woo as Woo Yeon-woo
 Jung Yoo-ahn as Kim Tae-oh
 Bang Jae-min as Jang I-rip.

Supporting
 Lee Joo-seung as LJ / Joo Seung-ri
 Park Hee-von as Kang Jae-young
 Cha Rae-hyung as Kevin
 Park Jong-hwan as Kim Hyun-jo
 Kwon Eun-bin as Eun-bin
 Ji Hye-ran as Song Hae-na
 Kim Ji-min as Park Seul-gi
 Yoo Hye-in as Hailey

Cameo
 Kim Su-hyeon as Pola, member of Apple Mint (ep. 8 and 16)
 Chungha as Chungha (ep. 14)
 Jang Dong-yoon as Dong-yoon (ep. 16)

Soundtrack
 "Gravity Acapella" - S.O.U.L (feat. Mook)
 "Sunshine" - Jung Yoo-ahn & Shin A-rin
 "Together" - Cha Eun-woo
 "Spring" - Ahn Hyo-seop & Z.Hera
 "Me In" - Bang Jae-min (feat. Chancellor)
 "Hold Me" - Park Jin-young
 "Spring" - Lee Won-seok
 "It's Love" - Lee Donghae
 "Camouflage" - Kevin Woo
 "Get Myself With You" - MCKay
 "Sugar Cane" - S.O.U.L (feat. Casper)
 "Get Myself With You" - S.O.U.L
"Drop The Pen Beat" - S.O.U.L

Episodes
Each episode is named after a k-pop song.

Notes

References

External links
 
 

Korean-language television shows
2018 South Korean television series debuts
2018 South Korean television series endings
South Korean romance television series
South Korean fantasy television series
YouTube Premium original series
Television shows based on South Korean novels
South Korean musical television series